Vkusno i tochka is a Russian fast food chain based in former McDonald's restaurants, with a menu that largely consists of rebranded McDonald's items. McDonald's closed their Russian stores in response to the Russian invasion of Ukraine; Vkusno i tochka restaurants mostly occupy former McDonald's restaurants that were sold to business magnate and entrepreneur , who was a company licensee in Siberia.

The first restaurants in Russia were opened on 12 June 2022. In Belarus, all 25 of the country's McDonald's restaurants have been converted into the Vkusno i tochka brand, starting from 22 November 2022.

History
On 8 March 2022, facing continued pressure on social media due to the Russian invasion of Ukraine, McDonald's announced the temporary suspension of operation of its restaurants in Russia, while also announcing at the same time that it would continue to pay its employees in the country. The restaurants were taken over by the CEO of McDonald's Russia, Oleg Paroyev, and remained open as of mid-March 2022.

On 16 May 2022, the company decided to leave Russia altogether. On 27 May 2022, it was reported that McDonald's was selling its stores in Russia to a local licensee, Alexander Govor. Patent filings showed "Fun and Tasty" and "The Same One" as some of the possible brand names for the firm taking over McDonald's in Russia. Shortly after the announcement, the company replaced the McDonald's logo in favor of their own logo. The new name of the chain was later announced as Vkusno i tochka, translated as "Tasty and that's it". The legal entity remained the same but was renamed from McDonald's LLC to PBO System LLC, with Oleg Paroyev remaining as CEO.

On 12 June 2022, the restaurant chain reopened 15 restaurants in Moscow. The next day, the restaurant chain reopened 50 more restaurants in Moscow and the wider Moscow region. McDonald's has a 15-year option to buy its former restaurants back from Vkusno i tochka.

On 8 July 2022, RBK reported citing the company's press service that some restaurants would stop selling French fries and potato dishes due to a poor harvest the previous year, possibly until fall.

On 11 November 2022, Vkusno i tochka began expanding to Belarus, all 25 Belarusian McDonald's restaurants agreed under ownership of KSB Victory Restaurants to transition into the new brand. The new branding was established on 22 November 2022.

Alexander Govor confirmed that "Vkusno i tochka" maintains regular contacts with McDonald's.

"Vkusno i tochka" will not work under its brand in Kazakhstan due to the terms of the contract with McDonald's. However Vkusno i tochka applied to register its brand name.

Menu

At the initial stage of the opening, the restaurants did carry every menu item that they had originally planned for due to supply chain issues and packaging logistics. According to the quality manager Alexander Merkulov, the dishes contain the same ingredients and are made with the same equipment as when McDonald's operated the restaurants, but are served with different packaging.

"Vkusno i tochka" did not serve the Big Mac until February 2022. Due to The Coca-Cola Company's departure from Russia, supplies for Coca-Cola were running low as of June 2022. In September, Vkusno i tochka replaced Coca-Cola brand drinks with analogous drinks of the brand Dobry (which also belongs to the Coca-Cola Company).
	
As of February 2023, the chain serves the following items (the McDonald's items they replace are in parentheses):

 Hamburger, Cheeseburger and Double Cheeseburger 
 Big Hit (Big Mac) and Double Big Hit
 Grand (Quarter Pounder with Cheese / McRoyal), Double Grand, Grand Deluxe (Quarter Pounder with Cheese Deluxe) and Grand Three Cheese
 Big Special (Big Tasty), Double Big Special, Big Special Junior and Big Special Three Cheese
 Fishburger (Filet-O-Fish) and Double Fishburger
 Chickenburger (Junior Chicken), Chicken Hit (McChicken), Chicken Hit Jalapeño, Chicken Premier (Seriously Chicken) and Chicken Premier Jalapeño
 Mont Blanc Burger, Mont Blanc Burger with Chicken
 Caesar Roll (McWrap), Caesar Roll Bacon, Big Special Roll, Shrimp Roll and Fresh Roll
 French Fries, Grand Fries, potato wedges and potato slices
 Chicken nuggets, chicken strips, mozzarella dippers, cheese triangles, onion rings,  shrimp, apple slices and carrot sticks
 Vegetable salad, Caesar salad and Caesar salad with shrimp
 Dobry Cola (Draft), Dobry Orange (Draft), Dobry Lemon-Lime (Draft), Coca-Cola (bottle), Sprite Ice (bottle), Fanta Zero (bottle), Fanta Manguava (bottle), Coca-Cola Zero (draft), Sprite (draft), Fanta (draft), Lemonade Ripe plum-Red currant (draft), milkshake, sundae, Ice Deluxe (McFlurry), tea, coffee, and juice
 Kids Combo (Happy Meal) 
 Breakfast pancakes, omelet, cherry pie, black currant pie and spicy apple pie

Controversies and criticisms

Logo and name
Since the opening of the restaurant chain, many users of the social networks VKontakte and Twitter did not like the name "Tasty - and that's it", some users reported that the variant of the name "Uncle Vanya" was not so bad. Critics of the new logo have noted its similarity to the logo of Marriott International, which also operates in Russia. For example, some said that the logo looks like "the logo of the Marriott hotel combined with the Flag of Bangladesh." On the opening day, one of the protesters held up a banner: "Bring back Big Mac!". He was quickly removed from the scene.

According to Nikolai Grigoriev, member of the Board of the Guild of Marketeers, the name of the fast food chain will not take root among consumers, he believes that the network may soon be renamed due to inconvenience of the name:

According to the marketeer, the old name "McDonald's" will soon disappear from the lexicon of the Russian consumers, and, to not pronounce the long phrase, clients of the chain will make up their own. On 13 June, various messages appeared claiming that the logo of "Vkusno i tochka" is a lazy alteration of a Portuguese pet food brand "Matosmix".

On 15 June, the director of a fast food chain known as "Food, full stop" in Primorski Krai, Sergei Ponkratov, accused the new chain of plagiarism and decided to sue it, demanding a change of the name. He claims that the Vkusno i tochka brand clearly intersects with and deprives his trademark, which has been operating since 2018, of uniqueness and recognizability.

Problems with food 
On 3 July, a customer of one of the Vkusno i tochka restaurants of the Khoroshyovo-Mnyovniki District complained about a burger with mold. The press office of the chain said that they had started an investigation into the moldy bun and contacted the manufacturer to clarify the circumstances of the incident.

On 4 July, the Telegram channel of Ksenia Sobchak, "Bloody mistress", reported that the chain's restaurant in Arbat "serves potatoes with cheese sauces that were expired by one day". The press office of Vkusno i tochka claimed that all the sauces were double-checked, "only a small part was expired, it has already been removed from sale... We are additionally checking the sauces in other enterprises so that this does not happen again." There was also an incident in Altufyevo, which was connected with restaurant production: buns, lying on a tray on the street, were eaten by crows and pigeons. In response, the press office of Vkusno i tochka said that the buns were bird food, noting that "Quality and safety of production is our main priority. The video captured the process of unloading. All upper bun trays, regardless of damage, were decommissioned." In addition, users of Twitter complained that insects parts have been found in burgers at Vkusno i tochka.

In July 2022, some restaurants of the chain said they would temporarily stop serving fries due to a shortage of the correct potato variety.

See also
 McDonald's Russia
 Metro, a similar chain of McDonald's replacements in Iceland
 Hungry Jack's, the localized version of Burger King in Australia

Notes

References

External links

	

Restaurants established in 2022
Fast-food chains of Russia
2022 establishments in Russia
Reactions to the 2022 Russian invasion of Ukraine
Internet memes introduced from Russia
Internet memes introduced in 2022